Blantyre Celtic Football Club were a Scottish football club that played under the auspices of the Scottish Junior Football Association. Formed in 1914 as Blantyre United, they changed their name to Blantyre Celtic two years later. Their home ground was near Springwell in Blantyre and they had as local rivals Blantyre Victoria, known locally as the Vics. In many ways they were the poorer cousin, as they existed in a poorer area of the village and lacked the financial support that the Vics gained from having a large social club attached to their home ground.

The club reached the semi-finals of the Scottish Junior Cup three times: (1923–24, 1937–38 and 1945–46) but lost on each occasion.

Between 1982 and 1986, their Craighead Park ground was also used by the Glasgow Tigers speedway team as their home track.

Blantyre Celtic played in green and white hoops, identical to those of their namesake Celtic. Their most famous player was Jimmy Johnstone.

In 2010, the club reformed as an amateur team in the Blantyre area.

Honours
 Lanarkshire Junior Football League winners: 1916–17
 Central Junior League winners: 1948–49
 William Blaney " Good Conduct Trophy" winners 1968

Former players

1. Players that have played/managed in the top two divisions of the Scottish Football League or any foreign equivalent to this level (i.e. fully professional league).2. Players with full international caps.3. Players that hold a club record or have captained the club.
 Tom Adamson
 Joe Murray
 Adam Plunkett
 Willie Smith
 Paul Wilson

References

Sources
 Scottish Football Historical Archive

External links
 Reformed club website
 Club Facebook
 Video clip of derelict ground from 1997
Blantyre Celtic Football Club (detailed history, 2014) at The Blantyre Project

Defunct football clubs in Scotland
Association football clubs established in 1914
Association football clubs disestablished in 1992
1914 establishments in Scotland
1992 disestablishments in Scotland
Blantyre, South Lanarkshire
Scottish Junior Football Association clubs
Football in South Lanarkshire